Montaña TV is a Venezuelan community television channel.  It was created in October 2004 and can be seen in the community of Cordero in the Andres Bello Municipality of the Tachira State of Venezuela on UHF channel 69.  Jose G. Chacon is the legal representative of the foundation that owns this channel.

As of now, Montaña TV does not have a website.

See also
List of Venezuelan television channels
Documental of a InstallFest filmed by Montaña TV

Television networks in Venezuela
Television stations in Venezuela
Television channels and stations established in 2004
Mass media in Venezuela
2004 establishments in Venezuela
Television in Venezuela
Spanish-language television stations